Xero is a New Zealandbased technology company that provides cloud-based accounting software for small and medium-sized businesses. The company has offices in New Zealand, Australia, the United Kingdom and the United States. Xero's products are based on the software-as-a-service model and sold by subscription, based on the type and number of entities managed by the subscriber. The products are used in over 180 countries.

History 
In 2006, Xero was founded by Rod Drury and Hamish Edwards in Wellington, where Xero Limited's headquarters are still located. The company was originally called Accounting 2.0.

By 2017, Xero had more than one million customers globally, and the following year, it had more than one million subscribers in Australia and New Zealand. In April 2018, Steve Vamos was appointed as CEO, replacing Rod Drury who remained on the board as a non-executive director. Vamos announced in November 2022 that he would step down in February 2023 and be replaced by Sukhinder Singh Cassidy, a former executive of Google and StubHub.

In 2019, the company announced it had over two million global subscribers, and three million subscribers in September 2021.

Product
The Xero accounting software uses a single unified ledger, which allows users to work in the same set of books regardless of location or operating system. It provides automatic bank feeds, invoicing, accounts payable, expense claims, fixed asset depreciation, purchase orders, bank reconciliations, and standard business and management reporting.

In 2011 and 2012, the Xero Touch mobile apps for iOS and Android devices were released.

In the 2019 financial year, Xero offered services relating to Making Tax Digital in the United Kingdom, Single Touch Payroll in Australia, and Payday Filing in New Zealand.

Funding
Xero went public on the New Zealand Exchange on 5 June 2007, with a  IPO, gaining 15% on its first trading day. It went public on the Australian Securities Exchange (ASX) on 8 November 2012. 

Xero transitioned to a sole listing on the ASX on 5 February 2018, delisting from the NZX on 2 February 2018. In September 2019, the market capitalisation of Xero on the ASX exceeded , and it was ranked as the third most valuable publicly-listed New Zealand company.

Xero has also received funding from various investors. In 2009, it received  of funding led by MYOB founder, Craig Winkler. It raised an additional  in 2010 from Peter Thiel's Valar Ventures who also invested an additional  in February 2012. It raised $49 million in a funding round in November 2012 with the largest amounts coming from Peter Thiel and Matrix Capital. The company raised more than $100 million at a valuation of approximately $1.4 billion on the NZE by May 2013. This valuation was before receiving an additional  from Thiel and Matrix in October 2013, bringing total funding to more than $230 million. Xero raised an additional $100 million from Accel and $10.8 million from Matrix Capital on 25 February 2015. As a result, the company was awarded 'best hybrid' deal of 2018 by Finance Asia.

Acquisitions and partnerships
In July 2011, Xero acquired the Australian online payroll provider Paycycle for a mixture of cash and shares totaling , to integrate the company's products into its services. It acquired Spotlight Workpapers in July 2012 for a mixture of cash and shares totaling $800,000.

In July 2018, Xero formed a partnership with US payroll platform Gusto. In August 2018, it acquired Hubdoc, a data capture application.

The payment included $31 million in cash and $49 million in earnout payments. Waddle allows small businesses to access loans secured by their accounts receivables. In march 2023 Xero announces it was cutting jobs and closing the Waddle app 

In November 2022, Xero announced establishment of a technology base in India in partnership with technology outsourcing company Infosys. The India technology base includes engineering and developer roles.

See also
 Comparison of accounting software

References

External links
 

2006 establishments in New Zealand
Accounting software
Companies based in Wellington
Companies listed on the Australian Securities Exchange
Companies listed on the New Zealand Exchange
Financial software companies
New Zealand brands
Software companies established in 2006
Software companies of New Zealand